George Taylor Jester (August 23, 1847 – July 19, 1922) was an American businessman and politician in Texas, where he served as Lieutenant Governor from 1895 to 1899.  He was born in Macoupin County, Illinois to Levi and Diadema Jester, and had several siblings. After their father died in 1851, their mother moved the family to Navarro County, Texas, where she joined her father.

After trying several professions including merchandising, Jester founded what would become the Corsicana National Bank with two of his brothers.  In 1890, he was elected to the Texas House of Representatives and served a term. He was elected in 1892 to the Texas Senate.  After serving two terms as Lieutenant Governor (as limited by the state constitution), Jester returned to Corsicana. He died there in 1922.

Jester married and had a family. His son Beauford served as Governor of Texas from 1947-1949.

External links
 

1847 births
1922 deaths
Lieutenant Governors of Texas
Democratic Party members of the Texas House of Representatives